Mafube Local Municipality is an administrative area in the Fezile Dabi District of the Free State in South Africa. The name is a Sesotho word meaning "dawning of the new day".

Main places
The 2001 census divided the municipality into the following main places:

Politics 

The municipal council consists of seventeen members elected by mixed-member proportional representation. Nine councillors are elected by first-past-the-post voting in nine wards, while the remaining eight are chosen from party lists so that the total number of party representatives is proportional to the number of votes received. In the election of 1 November 2021 the African National Congress (ANC) won a reduced majority of ten seats on the council.

The following table shows the results of the election.

Mismanagement
In 2015 the municipal manager, Nkabi Hlubi, allegedly awarded tenders to the value of R21 million to Pit Dog Trading. The latter company allegedly manipulated its tender grading and provided Hlubi with kickbacks of R1 million each time a municipal payment was made. Hlubi appeared in the Bloemfontein magistrate's court in 2021 on charges of fraud and corruption.

References

External links
 https://archive.today/20130621004819/http://www.mafube.gov.za/

Local municipalities of the Fezile Dabi District Municipality